Boreodromia is a genus of flies in the family Empididae.

Species
B. bicolor (Loew, 1863)

References

Empidoidea genera
Empididae